Roy Samuel Burmister (August 12, 1905 – January 19, 1980) was a Canadian ice hockey left winger known for his speed. He played 67 games in the National Hockey League (NHL) for the New York Americans between 1929 and 1932, scoring four goals and three assists. The rest of his career, which lasted from 1925 to 1939, was spent in various minor leagues. He was born in Collingwood, Ontario.

Although Burmister enjoyed a successful career, he faced difficulty as a junior player. At fifteen, he was fix-foot-six and of slim-build, and struggled to make the particularly strong 1921 junior Collingwood team. Burmister, however, proved himself as a highly competent and went on to become a pro player along with four of his teammates: Bern Brophy, Artie Clark, and Clyde Dey. 

He died of a heart attack at his Collingwood home in 1980.

Career statistics

Regular season and playoffs

References

External links
 

1905 births
1980 deaths
Boston Cubs players
Canadian expatriate ice hockey players in the United States
Canadian ice hockey left wingers
New York Americans players
Ice hockey people from Simcoe County
Kansas City Greyhounds players
New Haven Eagles players
Ontario Hockey Association Senior A League (1890–1979) players
Owen Sound Greys players
Philadelphia Arrows players
St. Louis Flyers (AHA) players
St. Paul Saints (AHA) players
Sportspeople from Collingwood, Ontario
Windsor Bulldogs (1929–1936) players